The 430th Expeditionary Electronic Combat Squadron is an active United States Air Force unit.   It is assigned to the 451st Expeditionary Operations Group.

The 430th Fighter Squadron, nicknamed "The Backdoor Gang", was first activated during World War II as part of the 474th Fighter Group and served in the European Theater of Operations, where it earned a Distinguished Unit Citation and the Belgian Fourragère for its actions in combat.  It remained in Europe after V-E Day, returning to the United States, where it was inactivated at the port of embarkation in December 1945.

The squadron was reactivated as the 430th Fighter-Bomber Squadron in 1952 as part og the 474th Fighter Bomber Wing and later the 474th Fighter Bomber Group, when it replaced an Air National Guard squadron in Japan.  It again saw combat in the Korean War, earning another Distinguished Unit Citation and a Republic of Korea Presidential Unit Citation.  The Squadron returned to the United States in 1954.

The 430th Tactical Fighter Squadron was deployed in September 1972 to Thailand to fly combat missions in the Vietnam War, and was awarded the Air Force Outstanding Unit Award with Combat "V" Device 28 Sep 1972-22 Feb 1973 and Republic of Vietnam Gallantry Cross with Palm 28 Sep 1972-22 Feb 1973.  It remained a fighter unit until inactivating in 1989.

In 1992, the unit became the 430th Electronic Combat Squadron, but was only active for one year.  It was converted to provisional status and received its current name in 2013.

History

World War II 
The 430th Fighter Squadron was activated on 1 August 1943 as a Lockheed P-38 Lightning fighter squadron under IV Fighter Command in Southern California as part of the 474th Fighter Group.  It trained with the P-38 over the Mojave Desert, moving to the European Theater of Operations, and was assigned to Ninth Air Force in England during March 1944. It operated out of Warmwell, Britain, and Saint Lambert, St. Marceau, and Peronne, France, Florennes, Belgium, and Strassfeld, Langensalza, Schweinfurt, and Stuttgart, Germany during and immediately after the war in 1945. Squadron markings on the vertical tail surfaces were a circle and "K6" with call sign "Back Door". It provided bomber escort but the primary role was as an attack and interdiction fighter. It flew its first combat missions on 25 April 1944. As part of the 474th Fighter Group, they attacked bridges and railroads in France in preparation for the Normandy invasion, provided air cover for the invasion force, and flew bombing missions to support the landings. Subsequently it conducted  armed reconnaissance missions after D-Day and attacked highways and troops to support the Allied breakthrough at St Lo. The Squadron supported the British attack on Holland in Sep 1944; the Battle of the Bulge Dec 1944-Jan 1945; and the airborne assault across the Rhine in Mar 1945. As part of the 474th, it was awarded the Distinguished Unit Citation for a mission on 23 August 1944 and twice the Order of the Day, Belgian Army. Personnel were demobilized in Europe during 1945, returned to the United States in November as an administrative unit and was inactivated on 7 December 1945 without personnel or equipment.

There is a monument at Neuilly-la-Foret dedicated in 1994 to the 474th Fighter Group. The associated information sign states in English and in French, "Construction of the A-11 airfield was begun on the 22nd July 1944 by the 832nd Engineer Aviation Battalion. It was declared operational on 5 August 1944 and accommodated the 474th Fighter Group and the P-38 Lightnings (fighter bombers). About 100 planes parked on this aerodrome of around 200 hectares. Only three squadrons, with 25 fighter bombers in each one, were operational. The rest were used for liaison between the different aerodromes. On 23rd August, the 474th Fighter Group had its hour of glory, when it destroyed a significant quantity of equipment and materiel amassed along the Seine, behind the pocket of resistance of Falaise-Argentan. On 25 August, 23 pilots from the 474th Fighter Group took off from the aerodrome. 11 of them fell above the Oise after a huge combat with German fighters. On 5 September 1944, the land of the A-11 airfield was returned to French authorities."

Korean War
Redesignated the 430th Fighter-Bomber Squadron in June 1952 and reactivated in Japan under Far East Air Forces, July 1952 as a result of the Korean War.   Replaced Federalized Georgia Air National Guard personnel, receiving their Republic F-84G Thunderjets.   Moved to South Korea in August as part of the 474th Fighter Bomber Wing, engaging in combat operations from Kunsan Air Base (K-8). From Kunsan the squadron bombed and strafed bridges, bunkers, troop concentrations, artillery positions, and a host of other enemy targets. Moved to Taegu Air Base (K-2) in April 1953 being attached to the 58th Fighter-Bomber Wing.  Flew interdiction and close air support missions in as well as attacking special strategic targets such as military schools, dams, and port facilities in North Korea until the June 1953 Armistice, Remained in South Korea for over a year afterward to insure Communist compliance with the cease-fire.

Cold War
Returned to Clovis Air Force Base, New Mexico in November 1954. Redesignated the 430th Tactical Fighter Squadron on 1 July 1958. Squadron was re-equipped with North American F-86H Sabre fighter-bomber aircraft, being assigned to Twelfth Air Force, Tactical Air Command.  Maintained proficiency in tactical fighter operations, deploying components, aircraft, and crews on a global basis in support of NATO, PACAF, AAC, and other organizations. Deployed to southeastern United States during the Cuban Missile Crisis of 1962.

Moved to Nellis Air Force Base, Nevada in 1966 as part of the 474th Tactical Fighter Wing (TFW). The 474th (Roadrunners) became the first USAF operational wing equipped with the General Dynamics F-111. On 20 January 1968 the 474th Tactical Fighter Wing was activated at Nellis Air Force Base, Nevada from the 4480th TFW, giving the base an operational tactical fighter wing assigned to Twelfth Air Force. On 15 September 1968 the 430th TFS became part of the Wing.

Vietnam War

Deployed to Takhli Royal Thai Air Force Base, Thailand in September 1972 as a result of the North Vietnamese Easter Offensive as part of the Constant Guard V deployment of the 429th TFS and 430th TFS with 24 F-111As in each squadron. The deployment included 1,487 support personnel and 40 transport aircraft loads of cargo. The enhanced strike capabilities of the two F-111A squadrons (48 aircraft) allowed them to replace the four F-4D squadrons (72 aircraft) of the 49 TFW, which returned to the U.S. This move also resulted in a reduction of total U.S. forces stationed in Thailand. The two F-111A squadrons arrived to support the last month of Operation Linebacker and all of the Operation Linebacker II bombing offensive against North Vietnam, conducted combat operations in Laos including support of Operation Phou Phiang II and Operation Phou Phiang III using the F-111A's beacon bombing capability in the defense of Long Tieng, and conducted combat operations in Cambodia, again using the F-111A's beacon bombing capability. They flew deep interdiction strike in good and bad weather when other squadrons were grounded. 430th TFS flew approximately 2000 combat missions with excellent success rates in hitting targets even when visibility was near zero before returning to the United States on 22 March 1973. A total of four 430th TFS aircraft were lost in action with the loss of all crews. The 474th was awarded the Air Force Outstanding Unit Award with Combat "V" Device 28 Sep 1972-22 Feb 1973 and Republic of Vietnam Gallantry Cross with Palm 28 Sep 1972-22 Feb 1973.

The 430th TFS photo depicts:
Front Row Left to Right: 1LT Jeff Sackett, CPT Henry Heinze, CPT Dick Hellier, CPT Price McConnell, CPT Willie Fairfax, CPT Denny Feinberg, MAJ Joe Hodges, MAJ Joe Franco, LTC Gene Martin, CPT Ron Walker, CPT Bob Wendrock, MAJ Dick Skeels, 1LT Tony Sobol, CPT Mark Christman, 1LT Jon Jordan, MAJ Norm Thouvenelle, MAJ Jack Ward. Back Row Left to Right: 1LT Don Westbrook, 1LT Bo Shaw, MAJ Dick Fleitz, MAJ Bill Brummett, CPT Jim Brunsting, CPT Wyn Lawrence, MAJ Larry Crowley, MAJ Pete Gamage, MAJ (unidentified), MAJ AO Philibert, 1LT Mike Hritsik, MAJ Russ Everman, MAJ Bill Young, MAJ John Tillander, MAJ Bill McKOY, MAJ Jim McElvain, MAJ Gordy Amsler, CPT Rob VanSickle, CPT Rowland Stanley, CPT Fred Eddy, CPT Mike Kaye, MAJ Jim Hammelmann. Not Present: 1LT Ken Alley, CPT Glenn Perry, 1LT Brad Insley (R&R), CPT Dan Kallenbach (R&R), CPT Chuck Caffarelli, CPT Ron Stafford, 1LT Craig Mading, MAJ Joe Smith, 1LT Rog Peterson (Jungle Survival Course), CPT Doug Kodak (Jungle Survival Course), 1LT Doug Meier (Jungle Survival Course), CPT Al Comeau (Jungle Survival Course), 1LT Lefty Brett (MIA), MAJ Bill Coltman (MIA), CPT Doug Kracht, CPT Gerry Robinson, 1LT Denis Galbraith, CPT Tom Jones, 1LT Gary Morehead, CPT Larry Wilson, 1LT Jim Stieber, CPT Art Rindell, CPT John Long, MAJ Dave Warman, CPT Chuck Henrdickx, 1LT Don McComb (Jungle Survival Course), LTC Bill Powers (Wing Attached), MAJ Bob Morrissey (Wing Attached)(MIA), MAJ Bob Brown (Wing Attached)(MIA)

Post Vietnam War

Engaged in training new pilots with the F-111A during the mid-1970s, changing equipment to the McDonnell F-4D Phantom II in August 1977 during "Operation Ready Switch", sending the F-111As to the 366th Tactical Fighter Wing at Mountain Home Air Force Base, Idaho and sending the F-111Fs from Mountain Home to Lakenheath Air Base in England to replace the departing F-4Ds.  Received new Block 1/5 General Dynamics F-16A Fighting Falcon aircraft in November 1980 after protractive development period in the 1970s.  Conducted routine Tactical Air Command training and deployments from Nellis with the F-16s, upgrading to Block 10/15 models in the early 1980s.   Inactivated 1 July 1989.

Electronic combat
Reactivated at Cannon Air Force Base, New Mexico as the 430th Electronic Combat Squadron on 1 August 1992 in conjunction with the realignment of all General Dynamics EF-111A Raven Electronic Warfare aircraft from Mountain Home to Cannon.  Relieved aircraft and trained 27th Operations Group personnel in operational use.   Once the move was completed the 430th was inactivated on 29 June 1993 and squadron personnel and aircraft were transferred to the 429th Electronic Combat Squadron.

The squadron was redesignated the 430th Expeditionary Electronic Combat Squadron on 13 February 2013 and reactivated at Kandahar Airfield, Afghanistan on 20 February 2013, when it replaced the 451st Air Expeditionary Wing's tactical airborne gateway, which had been operating since 2006. The unit flies the Northrop Grumman E-11 aircraft. The mission of the E-11A is to serve as a Battlefield Airborne Communications Node, a communications system that provides voice and data connectivity across the battlespace for air and surface operators.

On 27 January 2020, a United States Air Force E-11A aircraft (serial number 11–9358) belonging to 430th Expeditionary Electronic Combat Squadron crashed in Afghanistan's Dih Yak District, Ghazni Province. Two people on board were killed, the whole crew according to US military sources. The Taliban claimed to have shot the aircraft down.

Lineage
 Constituted as the 430th Fighter Squadron on 26 May 1943
 Activated on 1 August 1943
 Inactivated on 7 December 1945
 Redesignated 430th Fighter-Bomber Squadron on 25 June 1952
 Activated on 10 July 1952
 Redesignated 430th Tactical Fighter Squadron on 1 July 1958
 Inactivated on 15 November 1966
 Activated on 15 September 1968
 Inactivated on 30 September 1989
 Redesignated 430th Electronic Combat Squadron and activated 1 August 1992
 Inactivated 29 June 1993  
 Redesignated 430th Expeditionary Electronic Combat Squadron and converted to provisional status on 13 March 2013
 Activated 20 February 2013

Assignments
 474th Fighter Group, 1 August 1943 – 7 December 1945
 474th Fighter-Bomber Group, 10 July 1952 (attached to 58th Fighter-Bomber Wing 1 April 1953 – 22 November 1954)
 474th Fighter-Bomber Wing (later 474th Tactical Fighter Wing), 8 Oct 1957 – 15 November 1966
 4531 Tactical Fighter Wing, 15 November 1966 - 15 September 1968
 474th Tactical Fighter Wing, 15 September 1968 – 1 July 1989
 27th Operations Group, 1 August 1992 – 29 June 1993
 451st Expeditionary Operations Group, 20 February 2013
 451st Air Expeditionary Group, 1 April 2014 – present

Stations

 Glendale Airport, California, 1 August 1943
 Van Nuys Airport, California, 11 October 1943
 Oxnard Flight Strip, California, 5 January – 6 February 1944
 RAF Warmwell (AAF-454), England, 12 March 1944
 Saint-Lambert Airfield (A-11), France, 6 August 1944
 Saint Marceau Airfield (A-43), France, 29 August 1944
 Peronne Airfield (A-72), France, 6 September 1944
 Florennes/Juzaine Airfield (A-78), Belgium, 1 October 1944
 Strassfeld Airfield (Y-59), Germany, 22 March 1945
 Langansalza Airfield (R-2), Germany, 22 April 1945

 AAF Station Schweinfurt, Germany, 16 June 1945
 AAF Station Stuttgart/Echterdingen, Germany, 25 October – 21 November 1945
 Camp Kilmer, New Jersey, 6–8 December 1945
 Misawa Air Base, Japan, 10 July 1952
 Kunsan Air Base (K-8), South Korea, 10 July 1952
 Taegu Air Base (K-2), South Korea, 1 April 1953 – 22 November 1954
 Clovis Air Force Base, New Mexico, 13 December 1954 – 15 November 1966
 Nellis Air Force Base, Nevada, 15 September 1968 – 30 September 1989
 Cannon Air Force Base, New Mexico, 1 August 1992 – 29 June 1993
 Kandahar Airfield, Afghanistan, 20 February 2013 – 16 August 2021

Aircraft

 P-38 Lightning, 1943–1945
 F-84 Thunderjet, 1952–1954
 F-86 Sabre, 1955–1957
 F-100 Super Sabre, 1957–1965
 General Dynamics F-111, 1969–1977

 F-4 Phantom, 1977–1982
 F-16 Fighting Falcon, 1982–1989
 EC-130 Hercules, 1992–1993
 General Dynamics EF-111 Raven, 1992–1993
 Bombardier E-11A, 2013–present

Commanders

 Maj Leon B. Temple, 1 Aug 1943
 Unkn, 7 Jun 1944
 Maj Ralph C. Embrey, 9 Jun 1944
 Capt Edward A. McGough III, Oct 1944
 Maj John E. Hatch Jr., Nov 1944
 Maj Edward A. McGough III, Feb 1945
 Maj James L. Doyle, Feb 1945
 Lt Col Arvis L. Hilpert, 23 Aug-unkn 1945
 Lt Col Ellis W. Wright Jr., 10 Jul 1952
 Lt Col Frank B. Culver III, 4 Sep 1952
 Lt Col James M. Jones Jr., c. 1953-unkn
 Lt Col John E. Vogt, unkn-c. 1955
 Maj Robert L. Bobbett, 1955
 Capt William D. Adams, 1955
 Lt Col Bernie S. Bass, 3 Oct 1955
 Lt Col Emmett E. McClarren, 11 Jan 1956
 Lt Col Jake L. Wilk Jr., 2 Sep 1957
 Maj Robert E. Erickspon, c. 1960
 Lt Col Joseph S. Michalowski, 1961
 Maj Robert L. Herman, 14 Mar 1962

 Maj Emmett G. Saxon, 15 Dec 1963
 Maj Edward Hernandez, 3 Apt 1964
 Lt Col Robert L. Herman, 1 Aug 1964-unkn
 Unkn, 15 Sep 1965-22 Feb 1967
 Lt Col Lloyd O. Hawkins, 23 Feb 1967-15 Sep 1968
 Lt Col Robert K. Crouch, c. 16 Sep 1968
 Lt Col William R. Powers, 25 Jun 1970
 Lt Col James D. Black, 13 Apr 1972
 Lt Col John O. Hanford, 18 Jun 1972
 Lt Col Eugene F. Martin, 30 Jun 1972
 Lt Col Richard A. Flietz, 26 Apr 1974
 Lt Col Robert Wagner, Jun 1977
 Lt Col Gary E. Cox, 1 Mar 1979
 Lt Col Walter T. West, 28 Feb 1981
 Lt Col John P. Jumper, 1 Mar 1983
 Lt Col T. Ryan Torkelson, 14 Jun 1983
 Lt Col James E. Sandstrom, 28 Jun 1985
 Lt Col Michael Voss,1 May 1987
 Lt Col Michael R. Scott, 7 Oct 1988-1 Jul 1989
 Lt Col R. Larry Brough, 1 Aug 1992-29 Jun 1993

References

 Notes

 Citations

Bibliography

 
 
 
 
 
 
 
 
 
 
 
 
 
 
 
 
 Gunston, Bill. F-111, (Modern Fighting Aircraft, Vol. 3). New York: Salamander Books, 1983. .
 
 
 
 
 
 
 
 
 
 
 
 
 
 
 
 
 
 
 
 
 
 

Electronic warfare squadrons of the United States Air Force
Military units and formations in New Mexico
Military units and formations in Nevada